HIgher Huxley Hall was a manor house, later a luxury 5-star hotel, in Cheshire, England, located about 7 miles southeast of Chester. It lies west of the village of Huxley. Lower Huxley Hall lies less than half a mile to the immediate north of the hall. It dates from at least the 13th century and today has a white facade. Once in the possession of the Cholmondeley family, in 1850 it was owned by a Mr. R. Salmon. Howevever, in 1896 it was reportedly in the hands of a Mr. Vere Cholmondeley.

References

External links
Official site

Country houses in Cheshire
Hotels in Cheshire
Country house hotels
Buildings and structures completed in the 13th century
13th-century establishments in England